Watford F.C. Women are an English women's football club affiliated to Watford F.C., that play in the FA Women's National League South. They played in the FA Women's Super League (FA WSL) 2nd Division since the league's inception in 2014, after finishing runners-up in the FA Women's Premier League in 2013, until 2018–19. The club played in the third tier of the pyramid from 2018–19 to 2020–21, following a league restructure. They currently play their home games at Grosvenor Vale the home of Wealdstone F.C. in the FA Women's National League.

History
Back in 2013 the Hornets finished second in the FA Women's Premier League. On the pitch success was matched off the pitch as the club's application for a license to compete in the newly formed Women's Super League 2 was accepted.

The inaugural season got underway in April 2014, and the first game for Watford resulted in a 2–2 draw against Millwall Lionesses, with 330 in attendance. Impressive form away from home meant that Watford were in third place as the season approached the half-way point; however, some misfortune with injuries meant this form couldn't be maintained, and the club finished seventh.

The follow-up season ultimately proved to be a difficult one in terms of results, but there was success in other avenues. Watford's opening home league game against Aston Villa was held at Vicarage Road and attracted a fantastic crowd of 1,102. It wasn't the only impressive attendance of the season, as respective crowds of 465 (v Yeovil) and 514 (v Durham) saw the team play at Berkhamsted FC.

Having taken over the managerial position in the 2011–12 season and the general manager role for the start of the WSL, John Salomon had plenty to do with the upward trajectory at the Hornets. He stepped down from both roles at the end of the season to begin a new role with the FA. It meant there were two positions to fill. Ellie Kemp came on board as general manager, while Katie Rowson took on the position of head coach.

The third season again proved to be a difficult one on the field, but back-to-back home wins were recorded against Everton and Oxford United. Most importantly it was a campaign where Watford Ladies came under the umbrella of Watford FC for the first time, with the men's set-up giving plenty of support. One of the big changes was the club moving away from the grassroots set-up and Watford Ladies Youth.

With the WSL transitioning from a summer league to a winter league, it meant a mini nine-game season took place at the beginning of 2017. It was a much better time on the pitch, as the Golden Girls led by new head coach Keith Boanas earned eight points in a five-game period, more than they had earned in the entirety of either 2015 or 2016.

Watford also moved to a new home ground, with Kings Langley becoming the home of the Hornets, a partnership that continues to be fruitful for both to this day. Ed Henderson had helped stabilise the club during the Spring Series, having taken over as interim general manager. His work continued in the summer as he secured several new sponsorships and continued to build the profile of Watford, with 823 turning up for the game against Arsenal. It was another challenging season, however there were plenty of bright spots in the second half of 17–18. Armand Kavaja and Clinton Lancaster were put in charge and handed a number of young players their opportunities in the first-team fold. The coaching staff had played a big role in developing the players and performances were much-improved towards the end, with a 2–1 win at Oxford United the highlight.

The new make-up of the Women's football pyramid was confirmed on 28 May 2018 and despite a strong application, Watford were put in the FA Women's National League (Tier 3) rather than the FA Women's Championship (Tier 2).

In September 2019, Clinton Lancaster took the position of head coach, with Kavaja taking up an assistant role. The Golden Girls were on-track for potential promotion when the 2019–20 season was declared null and void due to the coronavirus pandemic in March 2020.

The name 'Watford FC Women' replaced the name 'Watford FC Ladies' in August 2020, with the club saying the new name was "representative of a modern view on language and equality and is in keeping with the way our governing bodies, supporters, squad and management regard the women's game".

In the 2020–21 season, Watford were promoted back into the second tier after a three season absence, due to The FA approving the club’s application for upward movement.

In the middle of 2022 Watford F.C. Women agreed to play the upcoming season at Grosvenor Vale the home of Wealdstone F.C. and on 1 July they signed striker Bianca Baptiste from Crystal Palace to join them for their 2022/2023 season.

League
FA Women's Premier League
National Division – runners-up: 2012-13
Southern Division – champions: 2006-07
Reserve Southern Division 2 – champions: 2012-13

Cup
Hertfordshire County Football Association
Women's Challenge Cup – winners: 2004–05, 2005–06, 2006–07, 2007–08, 2009–10
Women's Challenge Cup – finalists: 2008–09, 2010–11, 2012,13

Players

Current squad

Former players

   Adekite Fatuga-Dada

Club officials and support staff

References

2014 establishments in England
Association football clubs established in 2014
Women's football clubs in London